Lego Bricktales is a puzzle adventure game developed by ClockStone Studio and published by Thunderful. Lego Bricktales was released for Windows, Linux, MacOS, Nintendo Switch, PlayStation 4, PlayStation 5, Xbox One and Xbox Series X/S on 12 October 2022. Lego Bricktales received generally positive reviews.

Gameplay
Lego Bricktales is a puzzle adventure game. The player explores five unique diorama biomes (Jungles, Deserts, Cities, Medieval Castle and Caribbean Islands), solving puzzles and helping Lego minifigures. The Sandbox Mode allows players to create their Lego buildings and vehicles. Following the story of grandfather, an inventor who calls for help to save his amusement park by bringing it up to code. The player must restore the amusement park.

Development and release
Lego Bricktales was developed by ClockStone Studio and published by Thunderful in 2019. The ClockStone Studio had refine its building mechanic, scrutinize its puzzle design and strengthen the script. Lego Builder's Journey developers helped the Lego Bricktales developers to recreate the game in a digital game. Clockstone founder Tri Do Dinh explained, "It was definitely an inspiration, like we were aware of it even back then when it was only available on mobile,” and continued, “We didn’t really dive too deeply into the details of it. We did have some exchange."

Lego Bricktales was released for Windows, Linux, MacOS, Nintendo Switch, PlayStation 4, PlayStation 5, Xbox One and Xbox Series X/S on 12 October 2022.

Downloadable content
A downloadable content pack, "Easter content", is set for release in April 2023. It adds an Easter diorama, with a storyline that allows players to help the Easter bunny save Easter. It includes five construction puzzles, one collection quest, three wardrobe items and one music track.

Reception

Lego Bricktales  received mostly positive reviews. According to review aggregator Metacritic, the Nintendo Switch version received an average review score of 70/100,the PC version had 75/100, the PlayStation 5 version had 72/100 and the Xbox Series X version had 82/100.

IGN gave the game a 7 out of 10, saying "Building brick structures feels almost as good on the screen as it does in real life but frustrated by limited camera controls or an obscure objective." GameSpot gave the game an 8 out of 10, saying "Lego Bricktales functions like a STEM toy, teaching some basic engineering principles in a fun and engaging way, just like actual Lego bricks." Eurogamer's Tom Phillips gave the game a 3/5 and stated "It's a simple adventure game with a fun creative mode." Nintendo World Report gave the game a 7 out of 10, saying "Bricktaless focus on creativity and puzzle solving makes it feel more grounded than the fantastical Lego Star Wars and Marvel games."

Joey Thurmond for Common Sense Media gave the game a four out of five star rating and commented, "A lack of guidance can also confuse players with some puzzles and story objectives, not to mention several truly challenging builds that will stretch your creative muscles and patience. Even if there's unnecessary padding with fetch quests here and there as well, Lego Bricktales includes dozens of wonderfully designed building puzzles and brainteasers that test your environmental awareness and ordering skills."

Matt Gardner of Forbes criticized the game had a problem of the camera angle view. XboxEra gave the game an 8/10 for Xbox Series X version and stated, "Great variety in gameplay." Screen Rant gave the game a 3.5/5 and stated, "Lego Bricktales, much like the similar Lego Builder's Journey, is a great little puzzle game that provides a real sense of Lego building to the player. The customization and cute story keep the game interesting and the sandbox mode is a great way to practice building real Lego sets. There is never just one specific answer to a puzzle and mixing things up makes for a fun and enjoyable game that would work for Lego fans of any age."

Helen Ashcroft from Thegamer gave the game a 3.5/5 for PC version and stated, "decent-length story mode, some interesting puzzles, and a few extras for those who want them." PSU gave the game a 9/10 for PlayStation 5 version and stated, "Lego Bricktales is all about firing up the imagination to construct Lego to solve challenges as you subconsciously grin with the sort of wide-eyed wonder that Lego has always prided itself on inciting in builders both young and old."

Paste Magazine stated "Lego Bricktales’ sumptuous environments and largely clever puzzles shine despite its occasionally safe, repetitive design and difficult controls, though." Slash Gear gave the game a 6/10, saying "Gorgeous design."

Accolades

References

External Link 
 Official ClockStone Studio website
 Official Thunderful Group website

2022 video games
Lego video games
Nintendo Switch games
PlayStation 4 games
PlayStation 5 games
Xbox One games
Xbox Series X and Series S games
Windows games
Puzzle video games
Single-player video games
Video games developed in the United States